Sarwan may refer to:

People 
Ramnaresh Sarwan (born 1980), former West Indian cricketer
Sarwan Singh Phillaur, Indian politician, minister in the Punjab, India

Places 
Sarwan, Deoghar, a community development block in Deoghar district, Jharkhand. India
Sarwan, Deoghar (village), a village in Jharkhand, India
 Sarwan, Raebareli, a village in Uttar Pradesh, India
Sarwan Khera, a town in Kanpur Dehat district, Uttar Pradesh, India